Niklas Per Andersson (born 20 May 1971) is a Swedish former professional ice hockey left winger. In his career, he spent time with several National Hockey League (NHL) teams as well as various minor professional teams in North America, but mostly played for Frölunda HC in the Swedish Elitserien. He is the younger brother of former hockey player Mikael Andersson and the father of Lias Andersson.

Playing career
Andersson was selected in the 4th round (68th overall) of the 1989 NHL Entry Draft by the Quebec Nordiques, while he was playing in his native Sweden for Västra Frölunda HC. At the age of 20, he left Frölunda to play in the American Hockey League (AHL) for the Nordiques' affiliate, the Halifax Citadels. He played there for two years until the team moved to Cornwall, Ontario. After a year with Cornwall he was signed as a free agent by the New York Islanders, and assigned to their International Hockey League (IHL) club, the Denver Grizzlies (which became the Utah Grizzlies the following year), until being recalled halfway through the 1995–96 season. He finished that year with the Islanders, and played another two before signing with the San Jose Sharks prior to the 1997–98 season.

Andersson spent the following year with two minor clubs, one in the AHL and one in the IHL. He was not re-signed by the Sharks, and instead went to the Toronto Maple Leafs. He never played in the NHL for the Leafs, and was instead sent to the IHL's Chicago Wolves until he traded back to the Islanders on 17 August 1999 for Craig Charron. Partway through the season he was claimed off of waivers by the Nashville Predators and played seven games for them before being placed back on waivers and picked up by the Islanders again. He finished the year with them, playing in 17 games and scoring 10 points.

During the following off season he was signed by the Calgary Flames, but played most of the season in the IHL with the Chicago Wolves again. After that season, he returned to his native Sweden and his old club Frölunda HC, for whom he had been a key player the past nine seasons.

On 9 March 2011, Andersson decided to retire completely from hockey, having played 763 games for Frölunda HC. He is currently an amateur scout covering Europe for the Los Angeles Kings.

Career statistics

Regular season and playoffs

International

External links

1971 births
Living people
Calgary Flames players
Chicago Wolves (IHL) players
Cornwall Aces players
Denver Grizzlies players
Frölunda HC players
Kentucky Thoroughblades players
Halifax Citadels players
Los Angeles Kings scouts
Nashville Predators players
New York Islanders players
People from Kungälv Municipality
Quebec Nordiques draft picks
Quebec Nordiques players
San Jose Sharks players
Swedish expatriate ice hockey players in the United States
Swedish expatriate ice hockey players in Canada
Swedish ice hockey left wingers
Utah Grizzlies (IHL) players
Sportspeople from Västra Götaland County